Julien Perdaens (born 21 January 1903, date of death unknown) was a Belgian racing cyclist. He rode in the 1925 Tour de France.

References

1903 births
Year of death missing
Belgian male cyclists
Place of birth missing